The Night Creeper is the fourth studio album by English band Uncle Acid & the Deadbeats. The album released on 4 September 2015. The songs tell the story of a Jack the Ripper-style serial killer.

Reception

The Night Creeper received generally positive reviews from critics.

Track listing
All songs written by Kevin Starrs except "The Night Creeper", co-written by Dean Millar.

Personnel
Personnel adapted from liner notes.

Uncle Acid & the Deadbeats
 Kevin Starrs – vocals, lead guitar, bass, keyboard, organ
 Yotam Rubinger – guitars
 Itamar Rubinger – drums

Additional musicians
 Chantal Brown – backing vocals on "Downtown" and "Pusher Man"

Technical personnel
 Kevin Starrs – production, engineering, artwork
 Liam Watson – engineering
 Luke Oldfield – engineering
 Noel Summerville – mastering
 Jay Shaw – artwork
 Ygor Lugosi – artwork

References

2015 albums
Uncle Acid & the Deadbeats albums
Rise Above Records albums